Rahmatganj Muslim Friends Society is a sports club of Bangladesh based in Old Dhaka. It was founded in 1933. It is currently playing in the Bangladesh Premier League. It was also a team of Bangladesh Championship League until it got promotion in 2014 season. Haji Md. Salim MP is the current president and Imteaz Hamid Sabuj is the general secretary. Tiger Cement is the main sponsor of the club since 2014.

History

Shirt sponsors

Players

Current squad

Coaching staff
As of December 2020

Team records

Head coach's record

Honours

League
 Bangladesh Championship League
Champions (1): 2014
 Dhaka First Division Football League
Champions (1):  1994
Runners-up (1): 1996
 Dhaka League
Runners-up (1): 1977
 Dhaka Second Division Football League
Champions (1):  1964
 Dhaka Third Division Football League
Champions (1):  1963

Cup
Bangladesh Federation Cup
Runners-up (1): 2019–20
 Liberation Cup
Runners-up (1): 1977

References

Rahmatganj MFS
Old Dhaka
Association football clubs established in 1933
Football clubs in Bangladesh
1933 establishments in India